Mediaster aequalis is a species of sea star in the family Goniasteridae. It is native to the west coast of North America, ranging from Alaska to California. Also known as the vermilion sea star, it is the type species of the genus Mediaster and was first described in 1857 by the American zoologist William Stimpson.

Description
The aboral (upper) surface is bright red while the oral (under) surface is an orangey-red. The tube feet are red. There is a row of conspicuous marginal plates along the edge of the arms on the aboral surface, and the central disc bears many flat-topped ossicles (platelike calcareous structures); these consist of a central group of granules surrounded by a ring of about twenty-five marginal granules.

Distribution and habitat
M. aequalis is native to the western coast of North America, its range extending from Chignik Bay in Alaska southwards to Baja California.

Ecology
M. aequalis is both an omnivore and a predator and will scavenge for dead animals and detritus. As well as feeding on algae, it preys on tunicates (such as sea pork), sea pens, sponges, bryozoans, brachiopods and polychaete worms. In its turn it is hunted by the larger morning sun star. Juvenile M. aequalis often congregate among the tubes of Phyllochaetopterus prolifica, a tube-dwelling worm, and research in Washington state has shown that the larvae are highly selective in where they settle, exclusively choosing to do so on these tubes.

References

Further reading
 
 
 
 

Goniasteridae
Starfish described in 1857
Fauna of the Pacific Ocean
Taxa named by William Stimpson